John Ernest McMillin (1884 – August 20, 1949) was a Toronto building contractor who was elected to the House of Commons of Canada.

McMillin was a building contractor working in the east end of Toronto for 20 years prior to his death and was also a partner in the Main Realty Company of Toronto and president of the Ontario Property Owners Association.

He became active in politics in 1934. In 1943, he was elected as a school trustee for Toronto's Ward 8.

McMillin was elected as the Progressive Conservative Member of Parliament for the Toronto riding of Greenwood in the June 1949 federal election defeating Liberal Perry Ryan by less than 200 votes. However, McMillin died in August before the new Parliament was able to meet.

He was also a member of the United Church of Canada and had been on the board of stewards of Glenmount United Church.

McMillin died suddenly of a heart attack early on August 20, 1949 only 59 days into his term.

An October by-election to fill the vacancy created by McMillin's death returned Progressive Conservative James MacKerras Macdonnell to Parliament.

References

External links
 

1884 births
1949 deaths
Members of the House of Commons of Canada from Ontario
Progressive Conservative Party of Canada MPs